Larissa Lowing (born 26 January 1973) is a Canadian artistic gymnast.

Born in the Toronto suburb of Scarborough, Ontario, Lowing competed for Canada at the 1988 Summer Olympics in Seoul. She also competed at the 1990 Commonwealth Games winning a gold medal in the team event and silver medals in the beam and floor events.

References

1973 births
Living people
Gymnasts from Toronto
Sportspeople from Scarborough, Toronto
Olympic gymnasts of Canada
Gymnasts at the 1988 Summer Olympics
Gymnasts at the 1990 Commonwealth Games
Commonwealth Games gold medallists for Canada
Commonwealth Games silver medallists for Canada
Commonwealth Games medallists in gymnastics
Canadian female artistic gymnasts
20th-century Canadian women
21st-century Canadian women
Medallists at the 1990 Commonwealth Games